Leonard Chambers (born 31 December 1941) is a Jamaican cricketer. He played eight first-class matches for Jamaica between 1965 and 1975.

References

External links
 

1941 births
Living people
Jamaican cricketers
Jamaica cricketers
Place of birth missing (living people)